"Shampoo" is a song by Swedish singer Benjamin Ingrosso. It was released as a single on 12 June 2020 by TEN Music Group. The song peaked at number 25 on the Sverigetopplistan.

Critical reception
Jonathan Vautrey from Wiwibloggs said, "Sonically, the track is percussion-driven and has a wonderful casual-summer vibe to it. The last third of the song is mainly an instrument breakdown, with the trumpets adding an extra Latin-jazz flavour to the track."

Track listing

Personnel
Credits adapted from Tidal.
 Aron Bergerwall – composer, lyricist, mixer, producer
 Benjamin Ingrosso – composer, lyricist
 Mack – composer, lyricist
 Martin Ankelius – engineer

Charts

Certifications

References

2020 songs
2020 singles
Benjamin Ingrosso songs
English-language Swedish songs
Songs written by Benjamin Ingrosso